H.N.I.C. 3 is the third studio album by American hip hop recording artist Prodigy of gangsta rap duo Mobb Deep. The album was released on July 3, 2012, under Infamous Records. The album is the third and final installment of Prodigy's H.N.I.C. series. The album features guest appearances from Wiz Khalifa, T.I., Willie Taylor of Day26 and his Mobb Deep cohort Havoc. The album's production was handled by Sid Roams, Beat Butcha, Young L, S.C., Ty Fyffe and T.I., as well as Prodigy's frequent collaborator The Alchemist. H.N.I.C. 3 debuted at #105 on the Billboard 200 chart.

Track listing

Charts

References

Prodigy (rapper) albums
2012 albums
Albums produced by the Alchemist (musician)
Sequel albums
Hip hop albums by American artists
Albums produced by Oh No (musician)
Albums produced by Beat Butcha